Köprü is a station on the Konak Tram line in İzmir, Turkey. It is located along the Mustafa Kemal Coastal Boulevard in west Konak. The station consists of two side platforms, one on each side of the boulevard. 

Köprü station opened on 24 March 2018.

Connections
ESHOT operates city bus service on Mustafa Kemal Coastal Boulevard.

Nearby Places of Interest
Mithatpaşa high-school - A historic high-school built in the late 19th century.

References

Railway stations opened in 2018
2018 establishments in Turkey
Konak District
Tram transport in İzmir